Enrico Forti (born February 8, 1959), also known as Chico Forti or Kiko Forti, is an Italian former sportsman and entrepreneur. In 1997, he tried to buy the famous Pikes Hotel on the Mediterranean island of Ibiza. In June 2000, a Miami jury convicted Forti of shooting to death Anthony "Dale" Pike, the son of the founder of Pikes Hotel.

Background
Forti was born in Trento, Italy, where he lived until graduating from high school in 1978. In 1979, Forti started learning the sport of windsurfing on Lake Garda which is the largest lake in Italy. With Robby Naish, he became one of the first in the world to loop (i.e. back flip complete with the windsurf board), at Diamond Head, Hawaii (1984). Forti helped to design and produce the first windsurf jump ramp (funboard). In 1985, he was the first Italian to compete for the windsurfing world cup.

In 1987, a car accident interrupted his windsurfing career. Following a long convalescence, Forti began producing extreme sports films.  He wrote for sports magazines, and appeared on various sports television shows. In 1990, he created a production company that broadcast on ESPN and elsewhere, specializing in extreme sports. Also in 1990, Forti appeared in the Telemike television quiz show and won a large sum of money. That enabled him to move in 1992 to the United States. He divorced his Italian wife, and married a model with whom he has three children.

Murder of Dale Pike in Florida
In 1998, Forti was in process of buying the Pikes Hotel in Ibiza from the owner, Anthony Pike. Pike’s son Dale flew to Miami in February 1998 to find out what was going on, after he discovered a fax where his father (who had dementia) apparently signed the hotel and resort over to Forti. The body of Dale Pike, son of Anthony Pike, was found on February 15, 1998, at Virginia Key in Florida.

Prosecutors provided cell phone records showing Forti was near the beach where the body was found, plus a small sample of sand they found in Forti’s vehicle, matching the unique sand from Virginia Key. They also provided airport paging records confirming that Forti and Pike had been communicating over the airport intercom system, thus proving that Forti was lying when he denied having picked Dale Pike up at the airport.

Forti was sentenced to life in a Florida prison for killing Dale Pike, and state courts rejected his appeals on the murder conviction.  While Forti began serving his sentence of life without parole, the press in his native Italy compared his case to that of Amanda Knox, an American living in Italy who was famously convicted of murder based upon little evidence.

Requested transfer to Italian jail
The U.S. Department of Justice and the Italian government requested that Florida transfer Forti to prison in Italy. Therefore, in December 2020, Florida Governor Ron DeSantis conditionally approved transferring Forti to Italy, over the objections of Miami-Dade prosecutors.  The transfer is conditioned upon an assurance from the Italian government that Forti will complete the prison sentence given to him in Florida, plus consent of the victim’s next of kin.

In Italy, life without parole is illegal. DeSantis's move led commentators to predict Forti will be released from jail. Forti's transfer to Italy has therefore been impeded because Italy's internal jurisdiction would allow Forti to achieve a reduced sentence.

References

Italian sportspeople
Italian businesspeople
Italian people convicted of murder
Prisoners sentenced to life imprisonment by Florida
Living people
1959 births